Joseph Mensah (born 4 August 1945) is a Nigerian boxer. He competed in the men's welterweight event at the 1972 Summer Olympics.

References

External links
 

1945 births
Living people
Nigerian male boxers
Olympic boxers of Nigeria
Boxers at the 1972 Summer Olympics
Place of birth missing (living people)
Welterweight boxers